Stansel is a surname. Notable people with the name include:

Dwight Stansel (born  1947), American politician
Horace Stansel (1888–1936), American civil engineer and politician
Raymond Grady Stansel, American drug smuggler
Valentin Stansel (1621–1705), Czech Jesuit astronomer

See also
John Stansel Taylor, American politician, citrus grower, and businessman
Damus–Kaye–Stansel procedure, is a cardiovascular surgical procedure used as part of the repair of some congenital heart defects
Stansell
Stanzel